The 2012 Big Ten women's basketball tournament was held March 1 through March 4 at the Bankers Life Fieldhouse in Indianapolis, Indiana.  The tournament marked the debut of the University of Nebraska in this event.  The Big Ten Network carried all games except the championship game which was aired on ESPN2. Purdue won the tournament and received an automatic bid to the 2012 NCAA tournament.

Seeds
All 12 Big Ten schools participated in the tournament.  Teams were seeded by 2011–12 Big Ten Conference women's basketball season record.  A new tie-breaking procedure was announced for the 2012 tournament for teams with identical conference records.  The top 4 teams will receive a first round bye.

The seeding for the tournament was determined as the conference season concluded:

Schedule
Source

Bracket

All game times are ET.
* – Denotes overtime

References

Big Ten women's basketball tournament
Big Ten women's basketball tournament
Big Ten women's basketball tournament
College basketball tournaments in Indiana
Basketball competitions in Indianapolis
Women's sports in Indiana